Debbie Moon  is an English screenwriter and author, best known as the creator and show-runner of the CBBC fantasy series Wolfblood.

Career
Moon wrote a screenplay for the low budget science fiction feature The 7th Dimension, and two episodes of the children's series The Sparticle Mystery. Although she published many short stories and some novels early in her career, her break came when she submitted her idea for Wolfblood to the BBC Writers Room, where it was selected as a series. Moon came up with the idea during a visit to a bookshop, saw the words "wolf" in one book title and "blood" in another and blended them together. It ran for five series and was nominated for several awards, winning the Royal Television Society Award for the Children's Drama category in 2013;  the Banff Rockie Award in the category for 'Best Children's Programme (fiction)' that same year; In 2015 it won the British Screenwriters' Award in the category 'Best British Children's Television'. 

Moon expanded into adult drama with Hinterland. On June 10, 2022, it was announced Moon would adapt the Blue is for Nightmares novels by Laurie Faria Stolarz to television.

Works

Filmography

Novels
Falling, Honno Press, 2003,

Short stories
"Are You Now ...?" in the multi-author collection Premonitions: Different Eerie Warnings, 2004, Pigasus Press

Awards and nominations

|-
| 2013
| Wolfblood
| Children's Writer
| British Academy Children's Awards
| 
| 
| 
|-
|rowspan=2|2014
| Wolfblood
| Children's Drama
|rowspan=2|British Academy Children's Awards
| 
| 
|rowspan=2| 
|-
|Wolfblood
|Children's Writer
|
|
|-
|rowspan=2|2015
|Wolfblood
|Children's Drama
|British Academy Children's Awards
|
|
|
|-
|Wolfblood
|Best British Children's Television
|British Screenwriters' Awards
|
|
|

References

External links

Living people
Year of birth missing (living people)
21st-century British short story writers
21st-century English women writers
BAFTA winners (people)
English fantasy writers
English horror writers
English science fiction writers
English television writers
British women screenwriters
English women novelists
British women short story writers
Showrunners
Women science fiction and fantasy writers
British women television writers
Writers from London
British women television producers
21st-century British screenwriters